Dabas KK  is a Hungarian handball club from Dabas, Hungary, that played in the  Nemzeti Bajnokság I, the top level championship in Hungary.

Crest, colours, supporters

Naming history

Kit manufacturers and shirt sponsor
The following table shows in detail Dabas KK kit manufacturers and shirt sponsors by year:

Kits

Sports Hall information

Name: – OBO Aréna
City: – Dabas
Capacity: – 1920
Address: – 2370 Dabas, Iskola u. 5.

Management

Team

Current squad 

Squad for the 2022–23 season

Technical staff
 Head Coach:  Győző Tomori
 Assistant Coach:  Ákos Volcz
 Fitness Coach:  Balázs Kincse
 Goalkeeping Coach:  Péter Prohászka
 Masseur:  Sándor Kovács
 Technical Director:  István Szilágyi

Transfers
Transfers for the 2022–23 season

Joining 

  Bence Zdolik (LB) from  Grundfos Tatabánya KC
  Bence Bálint (LB) from  Grundfos Tatabánya KC
  Nándor Bognár (LP) from  Grundfos Tatabánya KC
  Tibor Nagy (GK) on loan from  Pick Szeged

Leaving 

  Balázs Holló (GK) to  Csurgói KK
  Ádám Török (CB) to  Ferencvárosi TC
  László Horváth (CB) to  Békési FKC
  Milán Váczi (CB) to  Szigetszentmiklósi KSK
  Péter Kende (CB) loan back to  Ferencvárosi TC
  Bence Burony (LP) loan back to  Ferencvárosi TC

Previous squads

Top scorers

Honours

Recent seasons

Seasons in Nemzeti Bajnokság I: 5
Seasons in Nemzeti Bajnokság I/B: 16

EHF ranking

Former club members

Notable former players

 Dávid Bakos
 Balázs Bíró
 Tamás Borsos
 Bendegúz Bujdosó
 Gábor Elek
 Bálint Fekete
 Balázs Holló
 Marinko Kekezović
 Levente Nagy
 Ádám Országh
 Péter Pallag
 Gábor Szalafai
 Zsolt Szobol
 Szabolcs Szöllősi
 Ádám Tóth
 Zlatko Horvat (2022–)
 Petr Šlachta
 Tanaka Kei
 Shinnosuke Tokuda
 Mihail Petrovski
 Ivan Perišić
 Nebojša Simović
 Vladimir Golovin
 Marko Krsmančić
 Vuk Milenković
 Eduard Klyuyko

Former coaches

References

External links
  
 

Hungarian handball clubs
Sport in Pest County